Rode Fjord (meaning 'Red Fjord') is a fjord in King Christian X Land, eastern Greenland.
The Rode Fjord is part of the Scoresby Sound complex in the area of Sermersooq municipality.

Geography
At its southern end the fjord is a northerly continuation of the Fonfjord. On the western shore, near the confluence, the Rolige Brae glacier flows into the fjord and a little further south the Vestfjord branches off to the west. There is a small island in the area named Rode Island (Røde Ø).

At the northern end the Rode Fjord is a southern offshoot of the Ofjord. This fjord separates the larger island of Milne Land from the mainland coast in the west. The Snesund is a shorter fjord branching off in a northeasterly direction about halfway through the Rode Fjord separating Storo and Sorte Island from Milne Land.

See also
List of fjords of Greenland

References

External links

Holocene glacimarine sedimentation, inner Scoresby Sund

Fjords of Greenland
Scoresby Sound